Dorothy Celene Thompson (July 9, 1893 – January 30, 1961) was an American journalist and radio broadcaster. She was the first American journalist to be expelled from Nazi Germany in 1934 and was one of the few women news commentators broadcasting on radio during the 1930s. Thompson is regarded by some as the "First Lady of American Journalism" and was recognized by Time magazine in 1939 as equal in influence to Eleanor Roosevelt.

Life and career
Thompson was born in Lancaster, New York, in 1893, one of three children of Peter and Margaret (Grierson) Thompson. Her siblings were Peter Willard Thompson and Margaret Thompson (later Mrs. Howard Wilson). Her mother died when Thompson was seven (in April 1901), leaving Peter, a Methodist preacher, to raise his children alone. Peter soon remarried, but Thompson did not get along with his new wife, Elizabeth Abbott Thompson. In 1908, Peter sent Thompson to Chicago to live with his two sisters to avoid further conflict. Here, she attended Lewis Institute for two years before transferring to Syracuse University as a junior. At Syracuse, she studied politics and economics and graduated with a degree in 1914. Because she had the opportunity to be educated, unlike many women of the time, Thompson felt that she had a social obligation to fight for women's suffrage in the United States, which would become the base of her ardent political beliefs. Shortly after graduation, Thompson moved to Buffalo, New York and became involved in the women's suffrage campaign. She worked there until 1920, when she went abroad to pursue her journalism career.

Journalism in Europe

After working for women’s suffrage in the United States, Thompson relocated to Europe in 1920 to pursue her journalism career. She was interested in the early Zionist movement. Her big break occurred when she visited Ireland in 1920 and was the last to interview Terence MacSwiney, one of the major leaders of the Sinn Féin movement. It was the last interview MacSwiney gave before he was arrested days later and died two months after that.
Because of her success abroad, she was appointed Vienna correspondent for the Philadelphia Public Ledger. 

While working in Vienna, Thompson focused on becoming fluent in German. She met and worked alongside correspondents John Gunther and G. E. R. Gedye. In 1925, she was promoted to Chief of the Central European Service for the Public Ledger. She resigned in 1927 and, not long after, the New York Post appointed her head of its Berlin bureau in Germany. There she witnessed firsthand the rise of the National Socialist or Nazi party. According to her biographer, Peter Kurth, Thompson was "the undisputed queen of the overseas press corps, the first woman to head a foreign news bureau of any importance".

During this time Thompson cultivated many literary friends, particularly among exiled German authors. Among her acquaintances from this period were Ödön von Horváth, Thomas Mann, Bertolt Brecht, Stefan Zweig and Fritz Kortner. She developed a close friendship with author Carl Zuckmayer. In Berlin she got involved in a lesbian affair with German author Christa Winsloe, while still married, claiming "the right to love".

Thompson's most significant work abroad took place in Germany in the early 1930s. While working in Munich, Thompson met and interviewed Adolf Hitler for the first time in 1931. This would be the basis for her subsequent book, I Saw Hitler, in which she wrote about the dangers of him winning power in Germany. Thompson described Hitler in the following terms: "He is formless, almost faceless, a man whose countenance is a caricature, a man whose framework seems cartilaginous, without bones. He is inconsequent and voluble, ill poised and insecure. He is the very prototype of the little man."

Later, when the full force of Nazism had crashed over Europe, Thompson was asked to defend her "little man" remarks; it seemed she had underestimated Hitler. The Nazis considered both the book and her articles offensive and, in August 1934, Thompson was expelled from Germany. She was the first American journalist to be kicked out.

At the New York Tribune

In 1936 Thompson began writing "On the Record", a New York Herald Tribune newspaper column that was also syndicated nationwide. It was read by over ten million people and carried by more than 170 papers. She also wrote a monthly column for the Ladies' Home Journal for 24 years (1937–1961); its topics were far removed from war and politics, focusing on gardening, children, art, and other domestic and women's-interest topics.

Radio and the Herschel Grynszpan affair
Around the same time as she started "On the Record", NBC hired Thompson as a news commentator. She began in 1936 and remained with NBC until 1938. Her radio broadcasts went on to become some of the most popular in the United States, making her one of the most sought after female public speakers of her time. When Nazi Germany invaded Poland in 1939, Thompson went on the air for fifteen consecutive days and nights.

In 1938, Thompson championed the cause of a Polish-German Jewish teenager, Herschel Grynszpan, whose assassination in Paris of a minor German diplomat, Ernst vom Rath, had been used as propaganda by the Nazis to trigger the events of Kristallnacht in Germany. Thompson's broadcast on NBC radio was heard by millions of listeners, and led to an outpouring of sympathy for the young assassin. Under the banner of the Journalists' Defense Fund, over $40,000 was collected, enabling famed European lawyer Vincent de Moro-Giafferi to take up Grynszpan's case.

Fame and controversy
In 1939, Thompson was featured on the cover of Time, with an accompanying picture of her speaking into an NBC radio microphone. The article was captioned "she rides in the smoking car" and it declared that "she and Eleanor Roosevelt are undoubtedly the most influential women in the U.S." She was one of the most respected women of her age. The article explained Thompson's influence: "Dorothy Thompson is the U.S. clubwoman's woman. She is read, believed and quoted by millions of women who used to get their political opinions from their husbands, who got them from Walter Lippmann." In Woman of the Year (1942) Katharine Hepburn played Tess Harding, a character directly based on Thompson. The Broadway musical is based on Thompson as well, this time played by Lauren Bacall.

During the 1936 presidential race, Thompson characterized Black voters as a bloc "notoriously venal. Ignorant and illiterate, the vast mass of Negroes are like the lower strata of the early industrial immigrants, and like them are 'bossed' and 'delivered' in blocs by venal leaders, white and black."

In 1941, Thompson wrote "Who Goes Nazi?" for Harper's Magazine.

Zionism and the State of Israel 
Thompson had been sympathetic to the Zionist movement since first setting off for Europe in 1920. On her voyage over, she had "endless discussions" of the movement with delegates traveling to the International Zionist Conference being held in London. In the late 1930s, as Thompson emerged as a leading advocate for Jewish refugees fleeing persecution in Europe, she grew close with Zionist statesman Chaim Weizmann and his lieutenant in the US, Meyer Weisgal. As World War II unfolded, Thompson went from being a sympathetic commentator to an outright advocate for the movement. She was a keynote speaker at the 1942 Biltmore Conference, and by war's end was regarded as one of the most effective spokespersons for Zionism. However, Thompson's attitude towards the movement had already begun to shift, most especially after a 1945 trip to Palestine, as she grew more concerned with the movement's right wing and its escalating terrorism against the British. After penning several columns critical of right wing Zionist terror, Thompson faced a tremendous backlash that ultimately led her into cooperation with leaders of the Jewish anti-Zionist organization, the American Council for Judaism. 

After publishing a 1950 critique of American Zionism in Commentary that raised the specter of dual loyalty, that backlash only grew. This included accusations of anti-Semitism, which Thompson strongly rebuffed, after being warned that hostility toward Israel was, in the American press world, "almost a definition of professional suicide". She eventually concluded that Zionism was a recipe for perpetual war. As Thompson's distance from the Zionist movement grew, she became an advocate for Palestinian refugees. After traveling to the Middle East in 1950, Thompson was involved in the founding of the American Friends of the Middle East, which was secretly funded by the CIA.

Personal life

She was married three times, most famously to second husband and Nobel Prize in literature winner Sinclair Lewis. In 1923 she married her first husband, Hungarian Joseph Bard; they divorced in 1927. Thompson married Lewis in 1928 and acquired a house in Vermont. They had one son, Michael Lewis, born in 1930. The couple divorced in 1942. She married her third husband, artist , in 1945, and they were married until Kopf's death in 1958.

Thompson died in 1961, aged 67, in Lisbon, Portugal, and is buried in the town cemetery of Barnard, Vermont.

In popular culture
Her marriage to Sinclair Lewis was the subject of Sherman Yellen's Broadway play Strangers, where she was played by Lois Nettleton. The play opened on March 4, 1979, and closed after nine performances.

The Silencing of Dorothy Thompson
In 2014 the media company Alternate Focus was raising money for A 90-minute documentary entitled The Silencing of Dorothy Thompson. The project had the backing of Alison Weir, the founder of If Americans Knew.

Works
 1928: The New Russia (Holt)
 1932: I Saw Hitler! (Farrar and Rinehart)
 1935: Maps
 1938: Dorothy Thompson's Political Guide: A Study of American Liberalism and Its Relationship to Modern Totalitarian States (Stackpole)
 1938: Refugees: Anarchy or Organization? (Random House)
 1937: Concerning Vermont
 1939: Once on Christmas (Oxford University Press)
 1939: Let the Record Speak (Houghton Mifflin)
 1939: Christian Ethics and Western Civilization
 1941: A Call to Action, Ring of Freedom
 1941: Our Lives, Fortunes, and Sacred Honor
 1941: Who Goes Nazi?
 1942: Listen, Hans (Houghton Mifflin)
 1944: To Whom Does the Earth Belong?
 1945: Wrangled by Two Cowboys
 1945: I Speak Again as a Christian
 1946: Let the Promise Be Fulfilled: A Christian View of Palestine
 1948: The Truth About Communism (Washington:  Public Affairs Press)
 1948: The Developments of Our Times
 1955: The Crisis of the West
 1957: The Courage to Be Happy (Houghton Mifflin)

See also
List of suffragists and suffragettes
List of women's rights activists
Timeline of women's suffrage

References

Further reading
  Cohen, Deborah. Last Call at the Hotel Imperial: The Reporters Who Took On a World at War (2022) American coverage of 1930s in Europe by John Gunther, H. R. Knickerbocker, Vincent Sheean, and Dorothy Thompson.excerpt
  Nancy Cott, Fighting Words: The Bold American Journalists Who Brought the World Home Between the Wars (Basic Books, 2020)
 Hertog, Susan. Dangerous Ambition: Rebecca West and Dorothy Thompson; New Women in Search of Love and Power (New York: Ballantine, 2011) 493 pp.
 Kurth, Peter. American Cassandra: The Life Of Dorothy Thompson (1990)
 Sanders, Marion K. Dorothy Thompson: A Legend in her Time (1973)  
 Sheean, Vincent.  Dorothy and Red (Boston:  Houghton Mifflin, 1963)

External links

 Dorothy Thompson Papers at Syracuse University
 Dorothy Thompson (1893–1961)
 Radio broadcast on Hitler's invasion of Poland (September 3, 1939)
 Video: Sands of Sorrow (1950). Dorothy Thompson speaks on the plight of Arab refugees from the 1948 Arab–Israeli War. Producer: Council for the Relief of Palestine Arab Refugees

Articles
 "Dorothy Thompson, the Journalist Who Warned the World About Adolf Hitler" by Kristin Hunt.

1893 births
1961 deaths
American women journalists
Methodists from New York (state)
LGBT people from New York (state)
Bisexual women
Syracuse University alumni
Journalists from Upstate New York
People from Lancaster, New York
People from Windsor County, Vermont
Viennese interwar correspondents
20th-century American non-fiction writers
20th-century American women writers
American suffragists
Members of the American Academy of Arts and Letters